The Party for the Comorian Agreement (PEC) is a political party in the Comoros.

History
In the 2015 parliamentary elections the PEC won one of the 24 directly-elected seats, with Saïd Ibrahim Fahmi elected in Itsandra South.

References

Political parties in the Comoros